David D. Levine (born February 21, 1961, in Minneapolis, Minnesota) is an American science fiction writer who won the Hugo Award for Best Short Story in 2006 for his story "Tk'tk'tk". His novel Arabella of Mars was published by Tor Books in July 2016.

Biography 
Although Levine has a long interest in reading and writing science fiction, he began as a writer of technical articles. He has primarily written short fiction; his first professional fiction sale came in 2001. A long-time member of science fiction fandom and early member of MilwApa (the Milwaukee amateur press association), he also co-edited a fanzine, Bento, with his late wife, Kate Yule, and has served as Convention Committee Chair for Potlatch. His short story "Ukaliq and the Great Hunt" appeared in The Phobos Science Fiction Anthology Volume 2 (2003).

Although he grew up in Milwaukee, Wisconsin, Levine now lives in Portland, Oregon.

In 2010, he spent two weeks in a simulated Mars habitat of the Mars Society, in Utah.

Bibliography

Novels
Arabella of Mars (Tor Books, 2016), 
Arabella and the Battle of Venus (Tor Books, 2017) 
Arabella the Traitor of Mars (Tor Books, 2018)

Wild Cards anthology
 Wild Cards I: Wild Cards – The 2010 Tor Books reprint contains the short story "Powers" that was not in the original 1987 Bantam Books release.

Short fiction 

Collections
Space Magic (Wheatland Press, 2008),  – Winner of 2009 Endeavor Award for best science fiction book in the Pacific Northwest 
Stories

Essays and reporting

Awards 
Andre Norton Award for Young Adult Science Fiction and Fantasy
 Arabella  of Mars (2016)

Hugo Awards
 

James White Award
 

Endeavor Award
 Space Magic (Distinguished Novel or Collection, 2009)

References

External links

David D. Levine website

1961 births
Living people
American male novelists
American male short story writers
American science fiction writers
American short story writers
Analog Science Fiction and Fact people
Hugo Award-winning writers
Novelists from Minnesota
Novelists from Oregon
Novelists from Wisconsin
Writers from Milwaukee
Writers from Minneapolis
Writers from Portland, Oregon